Giglio could refer to:

Giglio Island, an Italian island and municipality of Tuscany
Giglio Castello, Giglio Porto and Giglio Campese: hamlets of the island
Giglio v. United States, a U.S. Supreme Court criminal procedure case
Santa Maria Zobenigo, or Santa Maria del Giglio, a church in Venice, Italy
Stadio Giglio, a multi-purpose stadium in Reggio Emilia, Italy
as a first name
Giglio Gregorio Giraldi (1479–1552), Italian scholar and poet
as a surname
Bruno Giglio de Oliveira (born 1985), known as Oliveira, Brazilian central defender
Ermanno Giglio-Tos (1865–1926), Italian entomologist
Frank Giglio (born 1933), American politician
Giovanni del Giglio (15th century–1557), Italian painter
Joe Giglio (born 1967/8), Maltese politician
Joseph Giglio (born 1954), American politician
Louie Giglio (born 1958), American pastor
Luis di Giglio (born 1989), Italian cricketer
Maurizio Giglio (1920–1944), Italian soldier, policeman and secret agent for the Allies during World War II
Paolo Giglio (1927–2016), Maltese archbishop
Peter Giglio (born 1972), American novelist, editor and screenwriter
Stefan Giglio (born 1979), Maltese footballer
Tony Giglio (born 1971), American film director
 The giglio, or fleur-de-lis of Florence, Tuscany, Italy

See also
 Gigli